Jharkhand Lokayukta is the Parliamentary Ombudsman for the state of Jharkhand (India). It is a high level statutory functionary,  created to address grievances of the public against ministers, legislators, administration and public servants in issues related to misuse of power, mal-administration and corruption. It was first formed under the Jharkhand Lokayukta Act-2001,  and approved by the president of India. The passage of Lokpal and Lokayukta's Act,2013 in Parliament had become law from January 16, 2014 and requires each state to appoint its Lokayukta within a year.  A bench of Lokayukta should consist of judicial and non-judicial members. An Upa-Lokayukta is a deputy to Lokayukta and assists him in his work and acts in-charge Lokayukta in case the position fells vacant before time.

A Lokayukta of the state is appointed to office by the state Governor after consulting the committee consisting of State Chief Minister, Speaker of Legislative Assembly, Leader of Opposition, or leader of largest opposition party in State Legislature, Chairman of Legislative Council and Leader of Opposition of Legislative Council and cannot be removed from office except for reasons specified in the Act and will serve the period of five years.

History and administration 

Jharkhand Lokayukta Act-2001 was passed in the Jharkhand Assembly and was effective from the year 2001. The Act was created from Bihar after Jharkhand got separated as a state and it got operational in latter from 4 December 2004.  In 2011, Jharkhand Lokayukta Rules were amended to make them serious and to help remove corruption by including officials from top to bottom in the State Government offices and bringing Chief Minister's office under its purview.  Once a complaint is received against any Government official it is forwarded to a competent authority to conduct a preliminary investigation within a prescribed time frame and once the complaint is proved a regular case is filed. In 2015, Jharkhand Lokayukta had got a new office near Jharkhand Mukti Morcha(JMM) leader and party president Sibu Soren's official residence.

Lokayukta in Jharkhand does not have power of search and seizure.

Oath or affirmation

Powers 

Jharkhand Lokayukta has complete and exclusive authority for enquiring into allegations or complaints against the State Chief Minister, State Deputy Chief Minister, Ministers of the state Government, Mayors of cities, Leader of Opposition and Government officials.
The institution has powers to investigate and prosecute any government official or public servants who are covered by the act and abuses his authority for his self interest or causes hurt to anyone or any action done intentionally or following corrupt practices negatively impacting the state or individual.

Appointment and tenure 

Jharkhand Lokayukta is Justice Dhruv Narayan Upadhyay,  will head a two member team with a term of five years or reaching of the age of 70 years, whichever is earlier. He retired as a judge of Jharkhand High Court.
Jharkhand Lokayukta Chairperson will be appointed by Governor along with other members  who are recommended by a committee headed by Chief Minister and other members being 
Speaker of Assembly and Opposition Leader in Assembly, or elected leader of the largest opposition party in the Assembly.

Following is the list and tenure of various Lokayuktas of the state:

Notable cases 

 In 2019, Jharkhand Lokayukta Justice Dhruv Narayan Upadhyay on a complaint of corruption received  against Ranchi deputy mayor Sanjeev Vijayvargiya, had forwarded the same to state's Anti-corruption department with a direction to investigate.
 In 2019, Jharkhand Lokayukta on a complaint received formed a three member team to enquire into allegations of corruption and misuse of office by officials of National Dairy Development Board (NDDB) and Jharkhand State Cooperative Milk Producers’ Federation (JMF) and were found to be correct.

See also 

Goa Lokayukta
Karnataka Lokayukta
Chhattisgarh Lokayog
Haryana Lokayukta

References

External links 
 official website

Lokayuktas
Jharkhand